Type C2 ships were designed by the United States Maritime Commission (MARCOM) in 1937–38. They were all-purpose cargo ships with five holds, and U.S. shipyards built 328 of them from 1939 to 1945. Compared to ships built before 1939, the C2s were remarkable for their speed and fuel economy. Later ships varied somewhat in size. Some, intended for specific trade routes, were built with significant modifications in length and capacity.

In 1937, MARCOM distributed tentative designs for criticism by shipbuilders, ship owners, and naval architects. The final designs incorporated many changes suggested by these constituencies. The ships were to be reasonably fast but economical cargo ships which, with some government subsidies to operators, could compete with vessels of other nations. Building costs were to be minimized by standardization of design and equipment, and the ships were to have sufficient speed and stability that they could be used as naval auxiliaries in time of national emergency.

The basic specifications called for a five-hold steel cargo ship with raked stem and cruiser stern, complete shelter and second decks, and a third deck in Nos. 1–4 holds. Ventilation to the holds was provided by hollow kingposts, which also served as cargo masts. Cargo handling gear consisted of fourteen 5-ton cargo booms, plus two 30-ton booms at Nos. 3 and 4 hatches.

Living accommodations were much improved over previous designs, with crew accommodations amidships, officers quarters on the boat deck, and the captain's quarters on the bridge deck, along with the wheelhouse, chartroom, gyro and radio room. Hot and cold running water was provided throughout.

Many of the ships such as SS Donald McKay were converted by the U.S. Navy for service during World War II. The commercial versions were operated by the government during the war. Beginning in late 1945, the commercial ships were sold to merchant shipping lines, with service until the early 1970s.

Cost 
According to the War Production Board, in 1943 the C-2 had a relative cost of $313 per deadweight ton (10,800 deadweight tonnage) for $3,380,400; which at $14 to $1 inflation of 1945 to 2020 amounts to $48,136,896

Ships in class

Modified and Redesignated

 Stores Ship - AF (11)
 3  (C2)
 2  (C2-S-E1)
 , 
 6 of 10  (C2-S-B1-R)
 AF-50, AF-51, AF-52, AF-54, AF-60, AF-61
 Attack Transports - APA (1 + 6AP)
 3 s (C2-S-B1)
 APA-49, APA-50, APA-51 (AP-94, AP-95, AP-96)
 4 s (C2-S-E1)
 APA-52, APA-53, APA-54 (AP-97, AP-98, AP-99) 
 APA-94
 Transports - AP (13)
 7  (C2-S-B1)
 3  (C2-S-A1)
 2  (C2-S-AJ1)
  (C2-F)
 Cargo ship - AK (21 + 1 AKA)
  ... 
  ... , 
 , 
  ... 
  ... 
  (AKA-92) (in 1963)
 Attack Cargo Ships - AKA (60 + 17AK)
  (AK-26)
 11  (C2, C2-F, C2-T)
 AKA-1 ... AKA-4 (AK-18 ... AK-21)
 AKA-6 ... AKA-8 (AK-23 ... AK-25)
 AKA-11 ... AKA-14 (AK-28, AK-53, AK-55, AK-56)
 32  (C2-S-AJ3)
 AKA-64 ... AKA-87, AKA-101 ... 108
 30  (C2-S-B1)
 AKA-15 ... AKA-20 (prev: AK-64 ... AK-69)
 AKA-53 ... AKA-63, AKA-88 ... AKA-100
 General Stores Issue Ship - AKS (2 + 2AK)
 3 s
  (AK-42)
 Ammunition ship - AE (15 + 2AKA)
 7  (C2, C2-T, C2-N)
 , 
  
 8  (C2-S-AJ1)
 
 
 Aviation Supply Ship - AVS (1AK)
  (AK-43)
 Command ship - AGC (15)
 4 
  ... , 
 8 
  ... 
 3 
  ...

Notable incidents
 Highflier a C2-S-B, exploded and sank in 1947.
 Wild Rover a C2-S-B1, renamed Mormackite capsized in heavy seas and sank off Cape Henry on 7 October 1954. Survivors were attacked by sharks.
 , a C2-S-AJ1, on 26 December 1969 with a full load of 8,900 bombs, rockets, shells and mines bound for Da Nang, South Vietnam, cargo shifted and a bomb went off in rough seas.  On 5 January 1970 she sank north of Midway Atoll. 29 members of her crew died during the evacuation.
 , a C2-S-AJ3, renamed SS Guam Bear wrecked and sank in 1967. She was in a collision outside Apra Harbor, Guam.
 SS American Shipper, a C2-S-AJ5. Delivered December 1945.

  was torpedoed in 1942 and sank off Tunisia.
  was torpedoed in 1942, sank in North Atlantic.
 SS Louise Lykes was torpedoed and sank in the North Atlantic in 1943.
 SS Shooting Star was torpedoed and sank in South Atlantic in 1943, One US Armed Guard killed.
  was wrecked and sank off Newfoundland in 1942.
  exploded and sank in the Admiralty Islands in 1944.
 SS Fairport was torpedoed and sank in the North Atlantic in 1942.
 SS Santa Catalina was torpedoed and sank off Georgia 1943.
 SS African Star was torpedoed and sank in the South Atlantic in 1942.
 SS African Dawn (CH-111) collided with a tanker in convoy, 2300 hrs, Oct 28 1943.

See also
 Type C1 ship
 Type C3 ship
 Type C4 ship
 Liberty ship
 Victory ship
 U.S. Merchant Marine Academy

References

 
 
 United States Maritime Commission C2 Type Ships

Ship types
Type C2-N ships
Type C2-S-AJ1 ships of the United States Navy
World War II auxiliary ships of the United States